The Wizard's Spell Compendium is a series of four volumes of accessories for the 2nd edition of the Advanced Dungeons & Dragons fantasy role-playing game, published in 1996-1998.

Contents
The Wizard's Spell Compendium are a series of four books that present spells for the AD&D 2nd Edition game in a similar manner as the Encyclopedia Magica did for magic items, and collects every spell published in an official TSR product from 1975 to 1995 and even includes the spells from Spells and Magic. It updates each spell and in most cases gives the original reference as to where the spell comes from, and it separates the spells not only by alphabetical order, but by world of origin through little icons. Each volume includes a listing of spells found in that volume, broken down by spell level, and they by special lists, and the final volume includes a complete breakdown of all the spells by more than just those brief types.

Publication history

Reception
Joe Kushner reviewed Wizard's Spell Compendium III in 1998, in Shadis #48. Kushner found the icons to denote the campaign setting of origin for a spell to be "handy reference tools which augment the speed in which a player or DM can quickly find spells from a particular world". He noted that while it is a good reference book to have, it does have its problems as "TSR failed to account for the massive reprinting of recent spells that this would bring into recently printed products [...] It is my fear that when TSR does this for the Priest spells next year, that they shall reprint those spells found in the priestly spell books in the Encyclopedia Magica and all of the spells in Prayers from the Faithful. Kushner concluded his review by saying "For those who do not have those product though, or for those who wish fully updated spells, for after all Spells and Magic, and numerous other sources such as Chronomancy, have evolved, this is a perfect book but still on the expensive side at almost twenty five dollars.

Reviews
Backstab #9
Backstab #12
Dragon #240 - short review of Volume One

References

Dungeons & Dragons sourcebooks
Role-playing game supplements introduced in 1996